Peta Janossi is a fictional character from the Australian television soap opera Home and Away, portrayed by Aleetza Wood. She made her first appearance during the episode broadcast on 27 May 1999 and departed on 14 July 2000.

Peta is a local girl who seemingly blends into the background until she is given a makeover by Hayley Smith (Bec Cartwright). She begins a relationship with Will Smith (Zac Drayson) but it does not last. Peta is discovered to be living with her brother David (Philip Edwards) and invents a cover story in which a homeless woman, Annie Matthews (Carole Skinner) poses as Peta's late grandmother. She is then fostered by Joel (David Woodley) and Natalie Nash (Antoinette Byron).

Peta's final story arc revolves around her relationship with eccentric goth, Edward Dunglass (Stephen James King) and her support of him in the wake of the discovery of his Huntington's disease.

Casting
Wood was studying drama at university when she auditioned for the role of Peta. She explained, "I was on the phone to my best friend and I was actually talking about the audition, and my mobile rang, and it was my agent on the other line. He didn't sound too happy, and I just guessed that I didn't get it. He then yelled out that I got the part and I was screaming and having a two-way conversation with my friend and agent. I went to work that night and I was serving customers with the biggest smile on my face". While filming with co-star Zac Drayson, who plays Will Smith, Wood was approached by some fans which surprised her. She recalled, "I was filming on location when I first started on Home and Away and there were some English tourists asking Zac for autographs. They then turned to me and they all asked me for my autograph; I had no idea what to do or write. I actually think I was more nervous than they were".

Series producer Russell Webb chose Wood for the role of Peta due to her "fresh-faced" look. He said "She is a gutsy little performer, who at 20 looks young enough to play a 16-year-old but has that maturity level, which her character is supposed to have. She is perfect for the role."

In late May 2000, Jason Herbison of Inside Soap reported that Wood was leaving Home and Away after just over a year in the role of Peta. Herbison confirmed that Wood had already filmed her final scenes and was planning to spend the rest of the year in the UK. Wood commented, "I'm pleased to be going out on a high. There are some big storylines surrounding Peta's exit, which is great. I'm very happy to be moving to England, too."

Storylines
Peta appears when Hayley Smith (Bec Cartwright) is approached by a classmate, her friend Heather (Camilla Freeman), who wants her to be her partner in a competition for two friends to advertise skincare products. Peta accuses Hayley of taking Heather off her but learns Heather approached Hayley and considers Peta too plain to be her partner, Hayley and Peta ditch Heather and enter the competition together. Peta's makeover attracts the attentions of Hayley's older brother, Will. He asks her out but when Hayley mistakenly believes he was only getting her out of the way so she and her boyfriend Sam Marshall (Ryan Clark) can spend time together, Peta leaves in a huff. Hayley and Sam then scheme to put Peta and Will together.

Peta's home life raises questions from her when she alleges she lives with her grandmother but nobody has seen her and they become suspicious when Peta is reluctant to let them come over. It emerges that Peta's grandmother died while overseas in Poland the previous year and she and her brother, David (Philip Edwards) failed to report her death for fear they would be split up and sent to separate foster homes and continued living off her pension. A jury summons arrives for Peta's grandmother while David is away and Peta concocts a scheme with Will to have Annie Matthews (Carole Skinner), an elderly bag lady with bronchitis to pose as her late grandmother and has James Fraser (Michael Picciliri) writse a letter saying Annie is unsuitable for jury service. Events backfire when Annie takes her role to heart. Peta, wanting rid of Annie, enlists Will's help in tracking down Annie's daughter, Frances Kennedy (Alice Livingstone). The plan is successful but everything is revealed when Irene Roberts (Lynne McGranger) arrives.

Irene arranges for Peta to live with Travis (Nic Testoni) and Rebecca Nash (Belinda Emmett) but they are leaving Summer Bay shortly. Travis' brother Joel (David Woodley) and his wife Natalie (Antoinette Byron), become official foster parents and keep an eye on Peta and Justine Welles, the other remaining foster child. Peta's relationship with Will runs into difficulty when it is clear Will is still close to his ex-girlfriend  Gypsy Nash (Kimberley Cooper), When the group have a car crash Peta and Hayley are annoyed when Will covers for Gypsy but not the rest of them, supposedly because her Eventually, Will and Peta split and he reunites with Gypsy.

Edward Dunglass (Stephen James King) arrives in town and he and Peta become an item. When she tells him she regrets being unable to attend her gran's funeral, he arranges an improvised memorial service at the cemetery, although she is mortified when they were interrupted by Colleen Smart (Lyn Collingwood), who is convinced they are up to no good. Peta learns that Edward's father, Edward Senior (Peter Sumner) died of Huntington's disease, meaning he could well have inherited it, and is concerned by his "live for the moment" attitude, including diving off Jump Rock. She issues him an ultimatum; stop the stunts or they will break up. Initially, Edward take the second option but later changed his mind and they reconcile. The couple then begin attending self-defence lessons but Edward is discouraged but suggests Peta continue. Edward suggests they get married and they stage an unofficial wedding at the caravan park. There is resistance to the union but Edward's mother Judith Ackroyd (Anna Hruby) agrees to let the couple live with her.

Following Edward's official diagnosis of Huntington's, Peta supports him and agrees to go travelling with him. The couple then leave the Bay to stay with Judith's sister in Rome. Will visits them the following year.

Reception
For her portrayal of Peta, Wood was nominated for the Logie Award for Most Popular New Female Talent in 2000.

References

Home and Away characters
Television characters introduced in 1999
Female characters in television